Cirrhilabrus walshi is a species of wrasse native to the American Samoa. The specific name honours Fenton Walsh, at Cairns Marine, a marine aquarium-fish exporter in Queensland, Australia, who collected the type. in 1989.

References

walshii
Taxa named by John Ernest Randall
Taxa named by Richard Pyle 
Fish described in 2001